Substitute is a film by the French former footballer Vikash Dhorasoo. Filmed before and during the 2006 FIFA World Cup, Dhorasoo "recorded his thoughts and feelings throughout the tournament", resulting in a "deeply unconventional sporting film".

References

External links 
 

2006 films
French association football films
2000s French films
2000s French-language films